The Mangbetu–Asoa or Mangbetu languages of the Central Sudanic language family are a cluster of closely related languages spoken in the Democratic Republic of Congo.

The languages are Mangbetu, spoken by perhaps a million people, and the smaller Lombi and Asoa.

Blench (2000) considers Lombi to be part of the Mangbetu dialect continuum. Asoa is spoken by Pygmies.

Proto-Mangbetu has been reconstructed by Demolin (1992).

Comparative vocabulary
Mangbetu-Asua languages comparative lexicon:

See also
List of Proto-Mangbetu reconstructions (Wiktionary)
Central Sudanic word lists (Wiktionary)

Footnotes

References
 Nilo-Saharan list (Blench 2000)

Central Sudanic languages
Languages of South Sudan